Agathe N'Nindjem-Yolemp (born August 4, 1980) is a Cameroonian female basketball player.

External links
Profile at eurobasket.com

1980 births
Living people
Basketball players from Yaoundé
Cameroonian women's basketball players
Centers (basketball)